Nasser al-Awlaki (1946 – 28 September 2021) was a Yemeni scholar and politician. He was the father of Anwar and grandfather of Abdulrahman al-Awlaki, who were killed in separate U.S. drone strikes. Nasser's granddaughter's Nawar al-Awlaki was also killed in a U.S. raid in Yemen in 2017, the Raid on Yakla.

Biography  
He was a Fulbright Scholar and earned a master's degree in agricultural economics at New Mexico State University in 1971. He received a doctorate at the University of Nebraska, and worked at the University of Minnesota from 1975 to 1977. Nasser al-Awlaki served as Agriculture Minister of Yemen in Ali Abdullah Saleh's government. He was also President of Sana'a University. Yemen's prime minister from 2007 to 2011, Ali Mohammed Mujur, was a relative.

After the deaths of his son and grandson, Nasser published a six-minute audio message condemning the U.S. for the killings. In the audio, he said of then-President Barack Obama:

Al-Awlaki claimed his son Anwar was far from any battlefield. In 2010, al-Awlaki also said he believed Anwar had been wrongly accused and had not been a member of al-Qaeda.

On 29 January 2017, Nawar al-Awlaki, Nasser's 8-year-old granddaughter, was the third member of his family to be killed by the U.S. The girl was among several civilians killed in the Yakla raid, the first covert operation ordered by President Donald Trump. Nasser said that “She was hit with a bullet in her neck and suffered for two hours,” “Why kill children? This is the new (U.S.) administration - it’s very sad, a big crime.”

Nasser al-Awlaki's son Anwar was a U.S. citizen, born in New Mexico in 1971 while Nasser was earning his master's degree.

Al-Awlaki died on 28 September 2021 after suffering from illness.

References

External links
 

1946 births
2021 deaths
New Mexico State University alumni
University of Minnesota faculty
University of Nebraska–Lincoln alumni
Anwar al-Awlaki
People from Shabwah Governorate
Presidents of Sanaa University
Agriculture ministers of Yemen